The Sursock Museum, which is officially known as the Nicolas Ibrahim Sursock Museum, is a modern art and contemporary art museum in Beirut, Lebanon.

History
In 1912, the wealthy and prominent Lebanese aristocrat Nicolas Ibrahim Sursock built the private villa that now houses the museum. He decreed in his will that the villa be transformed into a museum. When he died in 1952, he bequeathed the villa to the city of Beirut. The museum opened in 1961, directed by Amine Beyhum, with an exhibit of works of contemporary Lebanese artists, setting a precedent for cultural events in Beirut.

The Sursock Museum building exemplifies Lebanese architecture, with its Italianate (specifically Venetian) and Ottoman architectural influences. It is one of the few remaining villas from its epoch in Beirut. It is located in the historic Rue Sursock in the Rmeil district of Beirut. The street is home to other mansions that were built in the 19th century by Beirut's most prominent families, such as the Sursocks and the Bustroses, even though this architectural heritage is threatened by developers and an almost-unregulated real estate market.

More than a hundred exhibitions have been held at the museum, including displays of works by Lebanese and international artists. The museum's permanent collection includes modern art, Japanese engravings and Islamic art. The museum collection consists of over 800 artworks, including paintings, sculptures, and graphic arts from the 19th and 20th centuries.

On August 4, 2020, the museum sustained significant damage and some of its artworks were destroyed as a result of an ammonium nitrate explosion.

The museum was restored thanks to the financial commitment of the Italian government, which allocated one million euro in May 2021.

Expansion
The museum was expanded with four new underground floors beneath the current garden, at a cost of US$12 million. French architect Jean-Michel Wilmotte and Lebanese architect Jacques Abou Khaled designed the expansion project.

The project increased the museum's area from 1,500 square meters to 8,500 square meters and opened additional exhibition spaces, a research library, an auditorium, a restoration workshop, new storage spaces for the collection, as well as a store and restaurant.  The museum reopened its doors on October 8, 2015.

Collection
The following is a list of Lebanese and international artists whose works are in the museum's permanent collection:

Chafic Abboud
Mouna Bassili Sehnaoui
Lotti Adaimi
Willy Aractingi
Anton Asfar
Assadour
Simone Baltaxé-Martayan
Juman Beyazit
Rafic Charaf
Saloua Raouda Choucair
Kees van Dongen
George Cyr
Paul Guiragossian
Georges Guv
John Haddian
Zavan Haditzian
Halim Jurdak
Elie Kanaan
Viola Kassab
Hussein Madi
Michel Elmir
Levon Moumjian
Mounir Najm
Omar Onsi
Mohammad Rawas
Aref Rayess
Nadia Saikali
Mohamed Sakr
Stelio Scamanga
Juliana Seraphim
H. Torrossian
Anita Toutikian
Sophie Yaramian
Khalil Zgaib
Alain Le Yaouanc

Exhibition history
Les arts plastiques au service de l'architecture, 1969
Art islamique, 1974
Hommage à Jean Khalife, 1993
Omar Onsi Rétrospective, 1997 
Georges Schehadé : poète des deux rives, 1905-1989, 1999
Max Ernst, 2000
Sergei Parajanov, collages and drawings, 2000
Moustafa Farroukh Rétrospective, 2003 
Regards sur Beyrouth, 160 ans d'images, 2015 
Danielle Genadry, The Fall, 2016 
Assadour, landscape in Motion, 2016 
Ali Cherri. A Taxonomy of Fallacies: The Life of Dead Objects, 2016 
Let's Talk About the Weather: Art and Ecology in a Time of Crisis, 2016 
Susan Hiller Magic Lantern, 2016
Adelita Husni-Bey: A Wave in the Well, 2016
Fabrik, 2017
Les mondes de Willy Aractingy, 2017
Hrair Sarkissian Homesick, 2017
Partitions et Couleurs : Hommage à Amine El Bacha, 2017
Fruit of Sleep. Curated by Reem Fadda – Part of Act II program of Tamawuj, Sharjah Biennial 13, 2017
Monira Al Qadiri: The Craft, 2017
Abed Al Kadiri, The Story of the Rubber Tree, 2018
Cy Twombly Photographs, 2018
Zad Moultaka: ŠamaŠ
Fleeting Exits, Curated by Marwan T. Assaf, 2018
Past Disquiet, Curated by Kristine Khouri and Rasha Salti, 2018
Gregory Buchakjian Abandoned Dwellings, Display of Systems, Curated by Karina El Helou, 2018
Laure et Mazen : Correspondance(s), 2019
La Fabrique des illusions: Collection Fouad Debbas et commentaires contemporains, 2019
Baalbek, Archives of an Eternity, curated by Vali Mahlouji, 2019
Picasso et la famille, 2019
At the still point of the turning world, there is the dance. Curated by Carla Chammas and Rachel Dedman, 2019

See also
 Sursock family
 Sursock House

References

External links
 Sursock Museum website
 Lebanon.com information
 Onefineart.com information

Art museums established in 1961
Museums in Beirut
Modern art museums
Biographical museums in Lebanon
Art museums and galleries in Lebanon
Palaces in Lebanon
Italianate architecture
1961 establishments in Lebanon
Arab art scene
Sursock family
2020 Beirut explosion